Muzhukay (Mıjıkay) is a rural locality (a selo) and the administrative centre of Muzhukaysky Selsoviet, Babayurtovsky District, Republic of Dagestan, Russia. The population was 545 as of 2010. There are 6 streets. Selo was founded in 1865.

Geography 
Muzhukay is located 13 km northeast of Babayurt (the district's administrative centre) by road. Yangylbay is the nearest rural locality.

References 

Rural localities in Babayurtovsky District